Milín is a municipality and village in Příbram District in the Central Bohemian Region of the Czech Republic. It has about 2,200 inhabitants.

Administrative parts
Villages of Buk, Kamenná, Konětopy, Rtišovice and Stěžov are administrative parts of Milín.

History
The first written mention of Milín is from 1336.

The Battle of Slivice, which was the last major battle of World War II in the territory of Czechoslovakia, took place within the municipality on 11–12 May 1945.

Twin towns – sister cities

Milín is twinned with:
 Ledro, Italy

References

External links

Villages in Příbram District